Ottoman civil war may refer to a number of wars of succession within the Ottoman Empire:

 Ottoman Interregnum (1403–1413), the most well-known

 Ottoman Civil War (1509–1513)
 Ottoman Civil War (1559)

See also
 Turkish civil war (disambiguation)